Brock Duckworth (born April 19, 1989 in Dallas, Texas) is an American soccer player.

Career

College and Amateur
Duckworth played his college soccer at the University of North Carolina Wilmington, where he was Second-team NSCAA All-South Atlantic in 2008 and Third-team All-CAA in 2009.

During his college career, Duckworth played with USL Premier Development League club Carolina Dynamo during their 2009 and 2010 seasons.

Professional
Duckworth signed his first professional contract on March 1, 2011 when he joined USL Pro club Wilmington Hammerheads. He made his professional debut on April 17, 2011 in Wilmington's first game of the 2011 season, a 1-0 win over the Rochester Rhinos. On April 30, 2012 Duckworth signed for the Myrtle Beach FC.

References

External links
 UNCW profile

1989 births
Living people
American soccer players
UNC Wilmington Seahawks men's soccer players
North Carolina Fusion U23 players
Wilmington Hammerheads FC players
Charleston Battery players
Charlotte Eagles players
Dallas Sidekicks (PASL/MASL) players
People from Parker, Texas
Soccer players from Texas
USL League Two players
USL Championship players
Association football goalkeepers